Christopher George Tomlinson (born 15 September 1981) is a retired English long jumper. He is the former British long jump record holder and competed at the Olympics of 2004, 2008 and 2012.

Career
Born in Middlesbrough, Tomlinson began competing for Middlesbrough AC (formerly Mandale Harriers) at the age of 10, mostly over 100m and 200m. He attended Nunthorpe Secondary School, where he still holds many of its year group records for triple and long jump, before attending Prior Pursglove College in Guisborough. In his early teens Chris decided to concentrate on long jump.  His major breakthrough came in 2002 when, just three months after breaking both wrists in a freak weight-training accident, he jumped 8.27 m to break the British record that had been held by Lynn Davies for 34 years. On 7 July 2007 he increased his record by a further 2 cm, jumping  while competing in Bad Langensalza in Germany.

Tomlinson competed for athletics club Newham and Essex Beagles for some time.

He has won seven national titles in various age groups, including one for the triple jump indoors for under 20s in 2000.

In February 2008 he became the world's top long jumper of the year so far with a leap of 8.18m. He won the silver medal at the 2008 World Indoor Championships. He competed at the 2008 Olympic Games without reaching the final. On 20 August 2009, his record was broken by 1 cm by Greg Rutherford in the qualifying for the World Championships long jump final. Both Rutherford and Tomlinson progressed to the final.

Tomlinson regained the British record in July 2011 with a jump of 8.35 m in Paris. Rutherford equalled this distance on 3 May 2012, before surpassing it in 2014.

Tomlinson was conferred with an Honorary doctorate by the University of East London in 2010.

Achievements

Note: Results with a q, indicate overall position in qualifying round

Personal bests

All information taken from IAAF profile and power of 10 profile.

References

External links

 
 
 
 
 
 
 
 
 
 
 

1981 births
Living people
Sportspeople from Middlesbrough
English male long jumpers
British male long jumpers
Olympic male long jumpers
Olympic athletes of Great Britain
Athletes (track and field) at the 2004 Summer Olympics
Athletes (track and field) at the 2008 Summer Olympics
Athletes (track and field) at the 2012 Summer Olympics
Commonwealth Games competitors for England
Athletes (track and field) at the 2002 Commonwealth Games
Athletes (track and field) at the 2006 Commonwealth Games
Athletes (track and field) at the 2010 Commonwealth Games
Athletes (track and field) at the 2014 Commonwealth Games
European Athletics Championships medalists
World Athletics Championships athletes for Great Britain
British Athletics Championships winners